Norman Beck is the name of:

Norman A. Beck (born 1933), American pastor
Norman Beck (footballer), English footballer